Scott W. Ambler (born 1966) is a Canadian software engineer, consultant and author. He is an author of books about the Disciplined Agile Delivery toolkit, the Unified process, Agile software development, the Unified Modeling Language, and Capability Maturity Model (CMM) development.

He regularly runs surveys which explore software development issues and works with organizations in different countries on their approach to software development.

He also has a passion for 8-bit Atari computers and is actively researching the history of the 8-bit Atari platform.

Biography 
Ambler received a BSc in computer science and an MA in information science from the University of Toronto. He has been working in the IT industry since the mid-1980s, with object technology since the early 1990s, and in IT methodologies since the mid-1990s. Scott has led the development of several software processes, including Disciplined Agile Delivery (DAD) (with Mark Lines), Agile Modeling (AM), Agile Data (AD), Enterprise Unified Process (EUP), and Agile Unified Process (AUP) methodologies. Scott was a Senior Consulting Partner with SA+A and then became the Chief Scientist at Disciplined Agile which became a part of the Project Management Institute while helping organizations around the world to improve their IT processes.

Ambler was a contributing editor with Dr. Dobb's Journal, and has written columns for Software Development, Object Magazine, and Computing Canada.

He is speaker at a wide variety of practitioner and academic conferences worldwide. Public conferences include Agile 20XX, Agile India 20XX, Software Development, Agile Universe, UML World, JavaOne, OOPSLA, EuroSPI, and CAiSE. Scott also is a keynote speaker at private conferences organized by large, Fortune 500 companies for their managers and IT staff.

He is a Fellow of the Disciplined Agile Consortium and the International Association of Software Architects (IASA). In the past he was an Eclipse Process Framework (EPF) committer and a Jolt Judge at the Jolt Awards.

Work 
Ambler has co-developed Disciplined Agile Delivery (DAD) with Mark Lines, the Enterprise Unified Process (an extension of the Rational Unified Process), and Agile Modeling.

See also 
 Database refactoring

Publications
Scott Ambler has published several books and articles. A selection:

References

External links

 Scott W. Ambler's Home Page
 Scott Ambler + Associates

1966 births
Living people
Canadian software engineers
Canadian technology writers